Michail Elgin was the defending champion, but he lost in the semifinal. He was eliminated by Iñigo Cervantes-Huegun.
Cervantes-Huegun defeated Jonathan Dasnières de Veigy 7–5, 6–4 in the final.

Seeds

Draw

Final four

Top half

Bottom half

References
 Main Draw
 Qualifying Draw

Mordovia Cup - Singles
Mordovia Cup
2009 in Russian tennis